The QF 4 inch Mk XVI gun was the standard British Commonwealth naval anti-aircraft and dual-purpose gun of World War II.

Service

The Mk XVI superseded the earlier QF 4 inch Mk V naval gun on many Royal Naval ships during the late 1930s and early 1940s.
The ammunition fired by the Mk V gun and the Mk XVI guns was different.

There were three variants of the gun produced with differing construction methods. The Mk XVI* replaced the A tube with an autofretted loose barrel with a sealing collar at the front of the jacket. The Mk XXI was a lighter version with an autofretted monobloc barrel and a removable breech ring. The total number of Mk XVI and XVI* guns produced was 2,555 while there were 238 Mk XXI guns produced. Of those totals 604 Mk XVI* and 135 of the Mk XXI guns were produced in Canada and 45 of the Mk XVI* were produced in Australia. These guns were usually mounted on HA/LA Mark XIX twin mountings, although several Australian frigates and corvettes had single-gun Mk XX mountings.

Acquired by the British Government in 1972, she served until 1977 when she was purchased by the Royal Malaysian Navy and renamed KD Hang Tuah.

List of equipped vessels

As secondary armament (list not complete)
 Aircraft carriers: , 
 Escort carriers: s, HMS Pretoria Castle, HMS Activity
 
 s (converted to anti-aircraft cruisers)
 HMS Barham, HMS Warspite
 s
 s
 
 s
 s
 s
 s (Town-class)
 Arethusa-class cruisers
 s
 Leander-class cruisers
 
 HMS Danae (ORP Conrad)
Roberts class monitor

As main armament (list not complete)
 s 
 
 Tribal-class destroyers
  (the first series L: HMS Gurkha, Lance, Legion, Lively)
 HMS Petard (modified)
 s
 s (after WAIR modification – 15 ships)
  (after WAIR modification)
 Hunt-class destroyers
 Some s (single-gun Mk XX mounting)
 s
 s
  (modified)
  (modified)
 Bay-class frigates
 River-class frigates (part of Canadian-built)
 8 auxiliary AA defence ships
 Some landing ships

Allied ships modified in the United Kingdom
  (Polish)
  (Dutch)
  (Dutch)
 4 French Elan-class avisos and s

The South African Navy Loch-class frigates (HMSAS Good Hope, HMSAS Natal and HMSAS Transvaal) each had two of these guns mounted on a twin Mark XIX on their foredeck between 1944 and 1976.

Ammunition

See also
 QF 4 inch Mk V naval gun : Royal Navy anti-aircraft predecessor
 List of naval anti-aircraft guns
 List of naval guns

Surviving examples
 On , Hamilton, Ontario, Canada.
 Naval Museum of Alberta, Canada
 Trenton Park, Trenton, Nova Scotia, Canada
 On , London, which retains four twin guns.
 Explosion! Museum of Naval Firepower, Gosport, Hampshire, UK
 On , Gdynia (re-bored to 100 mm).
 A pair at South African National Museum of Military History, Johannesburg
 A pair in a turret from INS Haifa (K-38), at Clandestine Immigration and Naval Museum, Haifa, Israel.
 One twin gun at the Marinemuseet, Horten, Norway.
 One twin gun in the Aldhurst military vehicles collection, Surrey England. Further research has proven the left gun was installed on the heavy cruiser HMS Devonshire from 1943 till she was scrapped in 1954.

Notes

References

Bibliography

External links

 B.R. 257. Handbook for the 4 inch Q.F. Mark XVI* Gun on the H.A. Twin Mark XIX And Single Mark XX Mountings. G3821/41 Naval Ordnance Department, Admiralty, July 1941.
 Tony DiGiulian, British 4"/45 (10.2 cm) QF HA Marks XVI, XVII, XVIII and XXI
 Youtube video clip of demonstration of loading and firing on HMS Belfast
 Youtube video clip of demonstration of loading and firing on HMS Belfast : closeup Note : for safety reasons, cartridges are seen being loaded without the normal attached shell.

Naval anti-aircraft guns
World War II anti-aircraft guns
Naval guns of the United Kingdom
100 mm artillery
World War II naval weapons of the United Kingdom
Military equipment introduced in the 1930s